The Marylebone Cricket Club tour of Australia in 1974-75 under the captaincy of Mike Denness was its sixteenth since it took official control of overseas tours in 1903-1904. The touring team played as England in the 1974–75 Ashes series against Australia, but as the MCC in all other games. In all there were 24 matches; 6 Test matches (which they lost 4-1), 9 other First Class matches (which they won 4-1), a One Day International, which they won, another one-day game, which they lost, and 8 minor matches (which they won 3-0).

Travelling to Australia
The tourists flew to Sydney, where Mike Denness held a press conference, then flew on to Adelaide for net practice and their first matches. Here they also saw Dennis Lillee in his first match since his breakdown in 1973, taking 4/82 and 3/40 for Western Australia against South Australia. Frank Tyson noted that the tour was far more hectic than the old days when the team arrived by boat. Instead of having seven first class matches and a similar number of country matches before the First Test they now only had four first class matches, and few of the England players had time to accustom themselves to local conditions. Most of the party only had two games under their belt when they played Australia at the Gabba. Also the country games were no longer two-day occasions for relaxation, but were crammed into a 10-hour, one-day flying visit, which allowed little time to be feted by the locals or for the players to rest.

South Australia Country vs MCC

Mike Denness was affected by a mystery virus thought to be caused by the long flight to Australia and his vice-captain John Edrich led the MCC, but the match was abandoned due to rain, which became a common occurrence as the Australian summer of 1974-75 was rife with heavy rain and floods.

South Australia vs MCC

The sluggish Adelaide pitch had been rendered even more toothless by its new wicket, the fresh soil removing its tendency to take spin after the second day. With five fast bowlers in the touring team there were bouncers aplenty as they vied for a Test place, which slowed down the over-rate to 10 or 11 an hour. Mike Hendrick did best with his 5/68 in the second innings and Derek Underwood took 7/127 in the match with his carefully placed spin. By coincidence the South Australian wicketkeeper was Mike Hendricks and he made 57 in the home side's first innings. The South Australian captain Ian Chappell top-scored with 78 in the second despite hooking early and often, but in the end the over-rate and flat pitch ensured a draw.

Victoria Country vs MCC

The MCC travelled to Warrnambool for the day to play a local Victorian Country XI. The tourists batted first and their 158/4 declared depended almost entirely on Brian Luckhurst's 94 and Mike Denness declared when he was bowled six runs short of his century. Only 65 overs were played in the day and the Victorians survived to stumps with 83/5 before the MCC team rushed to their hotel to see the Rumble in the Jungle between Muhammad Ali and George Foreman.

Victoria vs MCC

John Edrich led the team again against the 1973-74 Sheffield Shield champions Victoria under Ian Redpath, who won the toss and chose to bat. The MCG pitch proved to be as slow and flat at the Adelaide Oval and Victoria struggled to make 293/8 in 6½ hours. The wickets were shared around the English bowlers who struggled to dismiss the tailenders Ray Bright (53), Max Walker (23 not out) and Alan Thomson (11 not out), so in the end Redpath declared on the second morning. Brian Luckhurst carried on from the Victorian Country game with 116 and Dennis Amiss made 158 as they piled up 268 for the first wicket, but nobody else made 20 except for Alan Knott's 48 not out and Edrich declared on 392/9, 99 runs ahead on the first innings. Victoria held out for a draw and though the highest score was only 36 most of the batsmen dug themselves in in good Victorian style. After 333 minutes of batting they had reached 174/8, 75 runs ahead and the game was called off as a draw.

Australian Capital Territory and Southern New South Wales Country vs MCC

In another rain-affected match it was agreed that the MCC could bat first to get some batting practice. David Lloyd (66) and John Edrich (51) made 108 for the first wicket until Edrich "retired out" with a bad back and declared the innings at 159/2 after 34 overs. No England bowler took a wicket in the home innings as the top scorer Brian Kensey was run out for 30 and the game ended with them 58/1.

New South Wales vs MCC

The MCC met New South Wales under Doug Walters. Mike Denness won the toss and asked the NSW team to bat first. After the loss of Marshall Rosen at 7/1, Alan Turner (72) and Rick McCosker (52) added 104 and Test hopeful Ian Davis made a swashbuckling 91 and Gary Gilmour 59 not out as the home team made 338 with Chris Old taking 4/64. Keith Fletcher (79), Tony Greig (70) and Old (48) made quick runs and Denness declared still six runs behind at 332/7.  Though Turner (44) and McCosker (56) held things up with a second-wicket stand of 67 the rest of the team collapsed to the spin of Greig (5/55) and Underwood (3/22) and NSW were out for 174, leaving the MCC 181 to win. This they did thanks to David Lloyd (80) and Fletcher (57 not out) with 6 wickets to spare for their first win of the tour.

Queensland Country vs MCC

The match was abandoned due to rain.

Queensland vs MCC

The MCC arrived in Brisbane to play Queensland prior to the First Test on the same ground. Queensland, yet to win the Sheffield Shield, had taken to importing players from other states to strengthen their side. One was Greg Chappell, who left South Australia (where his elder brother Ian was captain) to take command of the Queensland side. Another was Jeff Thomson, from New South Wales, whose fierce pace was the talk of Australian cricket. Mike Denness won the toss and batted on what was usually a good pitch for pace bowling. Only Geoff Arnold failed to reach double figures, but the top scorer was John Edrich with 48 as the tourists were dismissed on the first day for 258 thanks to Malcolm Francke's 4/93, Thomson taking 1/22 off 11 overs. Queensland's reply depended almost entirely on their captain as Chappell made 122 of their 226 runs with no support except from wicketkeeper John MacLean's 37; no other batsman exceeded 15. Mike Hendrick took 4/49, Bob Willis 2/28 and Alan Knott 4 catches. Returning to bat in the second innings the MCC were out for 175 to the left-arm fast-medium bowling of Geoff Dymock (5/48) with Maclean picking up three catches. Set 208 runs to win Queensland were all out for 161 with Chris Old taking 4/44, Willis 2/27 and only Chappell (51) making any headway. The tourists won by a morale-boosting 46 runs, the first time they had beaten Queensland since the war, and looked set for the First Test.

South-East Queensland vs MCC

In a very short match before the First Test the MCC managed to complete a minor game for the first time on the tour. South-East Queensland were dismissed for 52 thanks to Tony Greig taking 5 wickets for one run off 29 balls. Fred Titmus took 3/12 and Dennis Amiss and Brian Luckhurst knocked off the runs in 11½ overs.

First Test – Brisbane

See Main Article - 1974-75 Ashes series

Western Australia vs MCC

A stricken MCC team arrived in Perth, Western Australia after the First Test. John Edrich and Dennis Amiss had had their hands broken from the battering they received from Lillee and Thomson. David Lloyd was recovering from a broken finger that had kept him out of the Test. Keith Fletcher had a bruised arm from the Test, which seemed fine until it was hit by a medium paced delivery in the nets from the assistant-manager Alan Smith and went numb so that he could not bat even though it was too late to change the XI. Smith was a wicketkeeper who had rarely bowled, but had swung the ball so much in the nets at Lords in 1972 that Geoff Boycott asked him to stop before he destroyed the confidence of the batsman who had to face Bob Massie. Bob Willis was nursing a groin strain and Peter Lever strained a side muscle and had to pull out of the state match. As a result, the team facing the Sheffield Shield champions Western Australia was chosen because only 11 players were fit, and as a result included both wicket-keepers Alan Knott and Bob Taylor, with the latter behind the stumps. The 41-year-old batsman Colin Cowdrey joined the party in Perth, but too late to play in the state game.

John Inverarity's Western Australia were at the peak of their powers, having won the Sheffield Shield in 1967-68, 1971–72, 1972–73 and would win again in 1974-75, 1976–77 and 1977-78. Dennis Lillee had returned to the team after his back injury of 1973 and was joined by the young Terry Alderman, while Wally Edwards and Ross Edwards batted for the team. Inverarity won the toss and batted on a surface that was known for being the fastest in Australia, but straight and true. They made 265/8 on the first day and declared, with Wally Edwards making a crabby 50 in his Bill Lawry style, Ross Edwards a more fluent 40 and Mike Hendrick and Fred Titmus each taking three wickets. In reply the MCC made 314/5 before declaring half an hour before stumps, mostly from Tony Greig (167) with help from Alan Knott (62) and David Lloyd (43). Western Australia made 241 runs on the third day as Bruce Laird (43) and Inverarity (99) made slow going before Rob Langer (Justin Langer's uncle) hit 62 not out and Graeme Watson 86 not out to take their team to 346/5 and a third declaration. MCC was asked to make 298 runs in 248 minutes and Mike Denness decided to go for a win rather than draw. After reaching 125/2 they collapsed to the leg-spinner Bob Paulsen, who took 7/41 to give Western Australia their first victory over the MCC by 120 runs.

Western Australia Country vs MCC

The MCC were still a team of walking wounded when they arrived in Geraldton. Their cause was not helped when Mike Hendrick was hospitalised with a fever during the match, which forced him to miss the Second Test. They borrowed a fast bowler from Perth called Peter Bronsdon who had the unusual distinction of playing for the MCC touring team, but did not bat, but took 1/10 in the Western Australian Country innings. The MCC batted first and Brian Luckhurst kept the innings together as Mike Denness sent in his bowlers to bat; Chris Old, Fred Titmus, Derek Underwood and Geoff Arnold before declaring at 214/6. This left him insufficient time to bowl out the local team as they struggled to 153/9 to save the game., Derek Underwood taking 3/20 and David Lloyd 2/20 with his left arm spin.

Second Test – Perth

See Main Article - 1974-75 Ashes series

South Australia vs MCC

The MCC played South Australia en route to Melbourne for the Third Test; Ian Chappell took a pre-Christmas rest and the home team were led by Ashley Woodcock, who won the toss and batted. Woodcock opened the innings and made 62 and Gary Cosier top-scored with 75. Derek Underwood managed to turn the ball and took 5/68 when Woodcock declared at 270/6 just before stumps. Denis Amiss (73) and Colin Cowdrey (78) added 108 for the first wicket and Mike Denness had a welcome return to form with 88 not out before he too declared at 277/2. Woodcock (48) and Rick Drewer (61) made 102 for the first wicket of the South Australian second innings and Gary Cosier made 48. The MCC spinners shared the wickets, Cowdrey's leg-spin taking 2/27, Underwood's slow left arm spin 2/30 and Fred Titmus's off-spin 2/48. They declared at 222/6 setting the tourists 216 to win in three hours. After Amiss (57) and John Edrich (37) made 93 for the first wicket and Denness sent in his bowlers for more batting practice and ended on 210/6, falling six runs short of their target. Gary Cosier had made his highest first class score of 75 in the first innings and now took his best first class bowling figures of 3/41 and Terry Jenner 3/78.

Third Test – Melbourne

See Main Article - 1974-75 Ashes series

First One Day International - Melbourne

See Main Article - 1974-75 Ashes series

Fourth Test – Sydney

See Main Article - 1974-75 Ashes series

On the rest day of the Fourth Test Peter Lever and the assistant-manager Alan Smith played a charity match at Drummoyne in front of a 15,000 crowd against the then ACTU leader Bob Hawke (who made 50) and the comedian Paul Hogan to raise money for the Darwin Disaster Relief Fund after Cyclone Tracy.

Tasmania vs MCC

Tasmania would not play in the Sheffield Shield until 1976-77 and were much weaker than the other states, so the MCC expected some gentle opposition despite the presence of Lancshire's Jack Simmons. The first day of the match was rained off, allowing the tourists some rest, and Dennis Amiss (32). Brian Luckhurst (59), Colin Cowdrey (38) and Mike Denness (42) availed themselves of some batting practice in England's 204/4. Denness declared on the last day and Tasmania made 189/5 in reply with Luckhurst's 1/1 putting him top of the tour bowling averages.

Tasmania vs MCC

The second match against Tasmania was very different as the bowlers were asked to restrain themselves on a green seaming pitch as neither side wanted injuries. Sadiq Mohammad opened for Tasmania after they were put into bat by Denness, but they were all out for 164, with Arnold, Old and Underwood taking three wickets apiece. The left-handed batsman Jim Wilkinson was injured immediately after he came in at 22/1 and returned at 79/5, but the innings relied on Barry Beard's 49. The MCC were 109/3 at the end of the first day and to everyone's surprise Mike Denness made 157 not out, adding 213 with Brian Luckhurst (74). John Edrich retired hurt on 35, when the MCC were 321/4, but Denness declared soon afterwards on 341/4. Tasmania collapsed again in the second innings, with Wilkinson top-scoring with 30 and the MCC won by an innings.

New South Wales vs MCC

The MCC won another victory against New South Wales, though that normally strong state was at a low ebb in the mid-1970s. Doug Walters won the toss and sent the tourists in to bat, but the first four batsmen made 50s, Amiss (52), Lloyd (51), Fletcher (85) and Denness (99) and after being 270/2 at one stage the MCC declared at 315/5. Alan Turner and Rick McCosker added 67 for the first wicket and Walters made 44, but NSW were out for 157 as Chris Old took 7/59 bowling at medium pace. This was enough to forestall the follow on and the MCC made 266/7 with Amiss passing 20,000 first class runs in his 124 and adding 133 with Alan Knott (79). David Colley took 2/64 and ran out Tony Grieg and David Hourn took his then best first class haul of 3/69 with his left arm unorthodox spin. Set 435 to win NSW were out for 237 thanks to Colley hitting 90 after they had been reduced to 141/8.

Fifth Test – Adelaide

See Main Article - 1974-75 Ashes series

Northern New South Wales vs MCC

The match against Northern New South Wales at Newcastle was a friendly affair with three declarations and the MCC winning even though both sides lost only 11 wickets. Mike Denness won the toss and put the locals in to bat. They made 251/5 with Ollie Bush making 63 and Charlie Barker 73 not out and declared shortly before stumps. Amiss (74) and Luckhurst (50) added 124 for the first wicket, John Edrich made 66 not out and Tony Grieg 42 to give them 281/5 declared and a lead of 30 runs. Northern NSW were 67/2 by stumps, but Bush (50), Ross Harworth (65 not out) and Geoff Davies (84) took them to 270/6 when they sportingly declared to leave the MCC 241 to win. This was made with four wickets to spare and at six runs an over thanks to Luckhurst (50), Cowdrey (85) and Edrich (40).

New Zealand vs MCC

This match was scheduled in the England tour programme to be played between the touring team and the winner of the Australian Domestic One-Day Cricket Final. In those days New Zealand cricket team played alongside the Australian states and won in 1969-70, 1972–73 and 1974–75, however as they were playing as a domestic side the match was not a One Day International. Denness won the toss and fielded, but saw New Zealand make 262/8 off their 40 overs with most batsmen chipping in and John Morrison top-scoring with 49 and the wicketkeeper Ken Wadsworth making 44. Tony Greig was the best bowler with 2/46 and top-scored in the MCC innings, thrashing 79 off 75 balls after coming in at 47/4 when Hedley Howarth took three top order wickets with his 3/24. Greig added 92 with Keith Fletcher (44), but wickets fell regularly thereafter and when he was out at 192/9 the match was all but over. New Zealand won by 66 runs, but Greig had the consolation of being the man of the match.

Sixth Test – Melbourne

See Main Article - 1974-75 Ashes series

Tour First Class Averages
source

References

Annual reviews
 Playfair Cricket Annual 1975
 Wisden Cricketers' Almanack 1976

Further reading
 E.W. Swanton, Swanton in Australia with MCC 1946-1975, Fontana, 1977
 Fred Titmus with Stafford Hildred, My Life in Cricket, John Blake Publishing Ltd, 2005
 Frank Tyson, Test of Nerves, Test series 1974-75 Australia versus England, Manark Pty Ltd, 1975
 Peter Arnold, The Illustrated Encyclopaedia of World of Cricket, W.H. Smith, 1985
 Ashley Brown, A Pictorial History of Cricket, Bison Books Ltd, 1988
 Greg Chappell, Old Hands Showed The Way, Test Series Official Book 1986-87, The Clashes for the Ashes, Australia vs England, Playbill Sport Publication, 1986
 Ian Chappell, Austin Robertson and Paul Rigby, Chappelli Has the Last Laugh, Lansdowne Press, 1980
 Colin Cowdrey, M. C. C. The Autobiography of a Cricketer, Coronet Books, 1977
 David Gower, Heroes and Contemporaries, Granada Publishing Ltd, 1985
 Tom Graveney and Norman Miller, The Ten Greatest Test Teams, Sidgewick and Jackson, 1988
 Brian Luckhurst and Mike Baldwin, Boot Boy to President, KOS Media, 2004
 Mark Peel, The Last Roman: A Biography of Colin Cowdrey, Andre Deutsch Ltd, 1999
 Ray Robinson, On Top Down Under, Cassell, 1975
 E.W. Swanton(ed), The Barclays World of Cricket, Collins, 1986
 Derek Underwood, Beating the Bat: An Autobiography, S.Paul, 1975
 Bob Willis, Lasting the Pace, Collins, 1985

Videos and DVDs
 Allan Border and David Gower, The Best of the Ashes - 1970 - 1987, 2 Entertain Video, 1991

External links
 CricketArchive tour itinerary 

1974 in Australian cricket
1974 in English cricket
1974–75 Australian cricket season
1975 in Australian cricket
1975 in English cricket
English cricket tours of Australia
International cricket competitions from 1970–71 to 1975
Australia 1974–75